Aksu is a village in the District of Nallıhan, Ankara Province, Turkey.

According to the Ottoman State Archives; Aksu was first acknowledged to exist in 1487. Though it likely existed before this date.

Aksu is recorded as the first and only name of the settlement.

References

Villages in Nallıhan District